Schitu is a commune in Olt County, Muntenia, Romania. It is composed of five villages: Catanele, Greci, Lisa, Moșteni and Schitu.

References

Communes in Olt County
Localities in Muntenia